Alfred Hitchcock (1899–1980) was an English film director.

Hitchcock may also refer to:

People
Hitchcock (surname)

Places
Hitchcock, Indiana, United States
Hitchcock, South Dakota, United States
Hitchcock, Texas, United States
Hitchcock, Oklahoma, United States
Hitchcock County, Nebraska, United States
Lake Hitchcock, a former glacially-formed lake of New England
Snell-Hitchcock Halls, two connected residence halls at the University of Chicago

Other uses
 Hitchcock (film), a 2012 film about filmmaker Alfred Hitchcock
 Hitchcock (automobile), an American car manufactured in 1909

See also
Hitchcockella